Luca Paolo Aleotti, known as Grido or Weedo (born March 30, 1979), is an Italian rapper and singer. Grido is a former member of the band Gemelli Diversi (1997–2014), and member of the crews Spaghetti Funk and TDK. He's also J-Ax' younger brother.

Biography

Beginnings
Born in Milan, Grido grew up in Cologno Monzese. His nickname (Grido, "Scream" in Italian) has been apparently given to him by his brother Alessandro (aka J-Ax) because he always cried as a child. His first appearance was a collaboration with his brother J-Ax in the song Cavaliere senza re, 1996. His second appearance was in the song Tutti Per Uno (Dj Enzo, 1997), when he was still part of his first band Rima nel Cuore along with Strano, now lead singer of Gemelli Diversi.

Gemelli Diversi
He then joined the group La Cricca, with Thema, Strano and THG, thereby forming the group of Gemelli Diversi (he was the youngest member). With GDV he recorded seven albums since 1998. Grido has also participated with Articolo 31 in various songs including Il mio consiglio, Buon sangue non mente, Due su due and Cavalieri senza Re.
During 2006 Fabri Fibra dissed Gemelli Diversi and Grido in particular (with the song "Idee Stupide"). Grido responded with an online video making a Fabri Fibra parody called "Standing Ovation". Fabri Fibra then responded at '"MTV Day" 2006 in Bologna. Gemelli Diversi responded again in the song "B-boy band" contained in the album Boom!.

Solo career
In May 2011, Grido published a solo album called Io Grido (I Scream), which was preceded by two singles, SuperBlunt (with Danti, Tormento and Sud Sound System) and Fumo e Malinconia, presented at TRL Music Awards 2011.
He finally left his band in 2014, changed his nickname in Weedo, before releasing his second solo album (Happy EP!).

Personal life
He has a son, called Davide, born in 2014.

Discography

With Gemelli DiVersi
 Gemelli DiVersi (1998)
 4x4 (2000)
 Come piace a me (2001)
 Fuego (2002)
 Fuego Special Edition (2003)
 Reality Show (2004)
 Reality Show – Dual Disc (2005)
 Boom!(2007)
 Senza fine (2009)
 Tutto da capo (2012)

Solo albums
2011 – Io Grido
2014 – Happy EP!

References

Italian rappers
1979 births
Living people
Cologno Monzese
Italian male singers
Singers from Milan